Callichthys is a small genus of freshwater catfish in the Callichthyinae subfamily of the armored catfish family, and consists of 4 species from South America. The genus Callichthys is distributed in most freshwater drainages of South America.

Taxonomy
The type species for this genus is Silurus callichthys.  The name Callichthys is derived from the Greek kallos (beautiful) and ichthys (fish). 3 of the 4 species were described only relatively recently.

The genus Callichthys is in need of taxonomic work, as it includes 13 nominal species but specimens of this genus are usually referred to as C. callichthys regardless of collecting locality.

Callichthys is the most basal member of the subfamily Callichthyinae. Linnaeus described the first species in this genus in 1758, but three other members have been found since 1999.

Species 
There are currently four recognized species in this genus:
Callichthys callichthys (Linnaeus, 1758) (Cascarudo)
Callichthys fabricioi Román-Valencia, Lehmann A. & Muñoz, 1999
Callichthys oibaensis Ardila Rodríguez, 2006
Callichthys serralabium Lehmann A. & R. E. dos Reis, 2004

Description
The genus Callichthys can be readily distinguished from other callichthyids by having the coracoids covered by skin and not exposed ventrally, the infraorbital bones also covered by skin, and the head highly depressed with less than 75% of the cleithral width (except sometimes in mature males).

Ecology
Callichthys is normally found in large schools on the muddy bottoms of slow-moving rivers, pools, drainage ditches, and swampy areas.  In water with low oxygen content, the fish are capable of utilizing atmospheric air by taking in a gulp of air at the surface of the water and passing it back to the hind gut.  The walls of the gut are lined with tiny blood vessels into which the oxygen from the air can pass, similar to the function of true lungs.  The remaining gasses pass out through the anus.   When there is a severe drought, these air breathers are  able to traverse short stretches of land seeking better conditions.   The fish is also capable of making sounds, both grunts and squeaks.

In the aquarium
Spawning has been accomplished in the aquarium.  Callichthys is a builder of bubblenests from plant parts, some bottom materials, and bubbles formed by a mouth secretion and air.  The male forms a mass of bubbles about 20 cm (8 in) in diameter and 10 cm (4 in) high.  During the time of construction, the female is actively chased away or ignored.   When the nest construction is complete, the male will accept the female.   The eggs (up to several hundred) are deposited into the nest and the male or the pair will actively protect the nest for about four weeks until the fry come out of the nest at the size of 2.5 cm (1 in).

References

 
Callichthyidae
Catfish genera
Taxa named by Giovanni Antonio Scopoli
Freshwater fish genera